The Ministry of Economic Affairs and Communications is a government ministry of Estonia. Its head office is in Tallinn.

Purpose 
The objectives of the Ministry of Economic Affairs and Communications is to create overall conditions for the growth of the competitiveness of the Estonian economy and its balanced and vital development through the drafting and implementing Estonian economic policy and evaluating its outcomes.

 The Ministry develops national development plans in the spheres within its area of government and will ensure their co-ordination with various transnational development plans, organises the funding, implementation and performance evaluation of such plans.
 The Ministry will participate, with other ministries, in the elaboration of development plans that focus on national economic development issues.
 Draft legal acts will be devised to organise the spheres within the Ministry's area of government, including the fulfilment of functions, assigned by these documents.
 Co-operation with the European Union and international organisation is organised within the Ministry's area of government.

The Ministry of Economic Affairs and Communications elaborates and implements the state's economic policy and economic development plans in the following fields:
 Construction and housing sector
 Post
 Energy sector
 Information society
 Economic development and entrepreneurship
 Transport sector
 Tourism sector
 Internal market of the European Union
 Foreign trade sector

References

External links

 Ministry of Economic Affairs and Communications
 Ministry of Economic Affairs and Communications 

Economy
Communications ministries